Amor de la calle (Love Street) is a 1950 Mexican drama film directed by Ernesto Cortazar and starring Meche Barba and Fernando Fernández.

Plot
El Pichi (Freddy Fernández) and other street children collect a ticket that has fallen from Fernando El Calavera (Fernando Fernández), which prevents stop them and offers them a job in his place of tortas in the neighborhood of La Lagunilla Market in Mexico City. Fernando knows Queta (Meche Barba), the sister of El Pichi, and both are attracted. This will lead to Fernando namely the hardness of life of people in the suburbs. Queta have to fight against the fate, which forces her to work in a cabaret with the nickname of Cariño.

Cast
 Meche Barba as Queta / Cariño
 Fernando Fernández as Fernando El Calavera
 Freddy Fernández) as El Pichi
 Esther Luquín as Mona
 Los Panchos
 Toña la Negra

Reviews
With great images of American cinematographer Jack Draper, Manuel Esperon songs and musical interventions of Los Panchos and Tona la Negra, Meche Barba gets a great job on Amor de la calle, with Fernando Fernández to restart a long period as her  film partner. The success of the film, led to a sequel filmed the same year: Si fuera una cualquiera (If I Were a Any), also directed by Cortázar.

References

External links
 
 Amor de la calle in FilmAffinity

1950 films
Mexican black-and-white films
Rumberas films
1950s Spanish-language films
Mexican drama films
1950 drama films
1950s Mexican films